6th Queens was an electoral district in the Canadian province of Prince Edward Island, which elected two members to the Legislative Assembly of Prince Edward Island from 1966 to 1993.

The district comprised the western half of the city of Charlottetown. Prior to 1966, the district was part of 5th Queens, and its creation marked the only redistribution of Prince Edward Island's provincial electoral districts to take place until the province adopted conventional single-member districts for the 1996 general election.

MLAs

Queens 6
1966 establishments in Prince Edward Island
1996 disestablishments in Prince Edward Island
Politics of Charlottetown